William Stoddart (born 25 June 1925, in Carstairs) is a Scottish physician, author and "spiritual traveller", who has written several books on the Perennial Philosophy and on comparative religion.

He has been called a "master of synthesis" and is one of the important Perennialist writers in the present day. For many years he was assistant editor of the British journal Studies in Comparative Religion. He has translated into English, from the original French or German, several of the books of the perennialist masters Frithjof Schuon (1907–1998) and Titus Burckhardt (1908–1984).

Bibliography

Books

As author
 Outline of Sufism: The Essentials of Islamic Spirituality (World Wisdom, 2013)
 What does Islam mean in today's world? (World Wisdom, 2012)
 Remembering in a World of Forgetting (World Wisdom, 2008)
 Invincible Wisdom (Sophia Perennis, 2007)
 Hinduism and Its Spiritual Masters (Fons Vitae, 2006) 
 Outline of Buddhism (Foundation for Traditional Studies, 1998) 
 Outline of Hinduism (Foundation for Traditional Studies, 1993) 
 Sufism: The Mystical Doctrines and Methods of Islam (Paragon House Publishers, New York City; Revised edition, 1985)

As editor
 The Essential Titus Burckhardt: Reflections on Sacred Art, Faiths, and Civilizations (World Wisdom, 2003)
 Religion of the Heart: Essays Presented to Frithjof Schuon on His Eightieth Birthday (Foundation for Traditional Studies, 1991) – co-published with Seyyed Hossein Nasr

Articles
Frithjof Schuon and the Perennialist School
Religious and Ethnic Conflict
Rama Coomaraswamy: between Perennialism and Catholicism (in collaboration with Mateus Soares de Azevedo)
Religion and Anti-Religion in Eastern Europe
The Role of Culture in Education
Right Hand of Truth: Life and Work of Titus Burckhardt
Aspects of Islamic Esoterism

See also

External links
Biography of William Stoddart
Studies in Comparative Religion

References

1925 births
Living people
Religious studies scholars
Scottish philosophers
20th-century Scottish medical doctors
Traditionalist School
People from South Lanarkshire